Catedráticos Elite Fútbol Club is a football club that plays in the Liga Premier de México – Serie A. It is based in the city of Salamanca, Mexico.

History
The team was founded in 2018 participating in the Liga TDP under the name Real Victoria Carmen and based in Tlaquepaque. In 2019 the team was relocated to Etzatlán, Jalisco, a municipality located 90 kilometers from its original location.

In the 2020–21 season the team reached the promotion stage of the Liga TDP for the first time, however it was eliminated in the round of 16 in its region by the Club RC–1128.

In July 2021 the team signed an alliance with Club RC-1128, to participate in the Liga Premier de México, finally, on July 30 the incorporation of the team to this league was announced taking part in Group 1 of Serie A de México, Due to entry into a higher league, the team was relocated to Ameca, Jalisco.

On January 27, 2023 the main team was relocated from Ameca, Jalisco to Salamanca, Guanajuato. The relocation of the club occurred after a merger with Petroleros de Salamanca, because the local oil sector was interested in having a professional team in the city, for this reason the team was unofficially called Catedráticos Petroleros.

Stadium 
The Estadio Olímpico Sección XXIV is a multi-use stadium in Salamanca, Guanajuato, Mexico.  It is currently used mostly for football matches and is the home stadium for Catedráticos Elite and Petroleros de Salamanca.  The stadium has a capacity 10,000 people and opened in 1951.

Between 2021 and 2022 the team played at the Núcleo Deportivo y de Espectáculos Ameca is a multi-use stadium located in Ameca, Jalisco, Mexico.

Players

First-team squad

Reserve teams
Catedráticos Elite (Liga TDP)
Reserve team that plays in the Liga TDP, the fourth level of the Mexican league system.

Managers 
  Enrique Arce (2018–2019)
  Jorge Humberto Torres (2019–2022)
  Juan Carlos Ascensio (2022–)

References 

Football clubs in Jalisco
2018 establishments in Mexico
Liga Premier de México
Association football clubs established in 2018